Moraine Strait is a strait on the McMurdo Ice Shelf of Antarctica that trends north–south between Brown Peninsula, Mount Discovery, and Minna Bluff on the west, and Black Island on the east. The surface of the strait, especially the northern part between Brown Peninsula and Black Island, is noteworthy for the presence of broad moraine belts that obscure much of the ice and suggest the name. The strait was discovered by the British National Antarctic Expedition, 1901–04, led by Robert Falcon Scott, and was named by the Advisory Committee on Antarctic Names in 1999.

References

Straits of Antarctica
Bodies of water of the Ross Dependency
Ross Archipelago